Geoffrey Stephen Klempner, of Kinectrics Inc. (formally AMEC NSS Ltd.) in Toronto, Ontario, was named a Fellow of the Institute of Electrical and Electronics Engineers (IEEE) in 2013 for his contribution to steam turbine-driven generators.

References

Fellow Members of the IEEE
Living people
Year of birth missing (living people)
Place of birth missing (living people)